Deinococcus geothermalis is a bacterium. It is extremely gamma radiation-resistant. Its type strain is AG-3a (= DSM 11300).

A space mission called EXPOSE-R2 was launched on 24 July 2014 aboard the Russian Progress M-23M, and was attached on 18 August 2014 outside the ISS on the Russian module Zvezda. The two main experiments will test the resistance of a variety of extremophile microorganisms, including Deinococcus geothermalis to long-term exposure to outer space and to a Mars simulated environment.

Genome structure
Deinococcus geothermalis has a genome that contains 2.47 Mbp with 2,335 protein coding genes. Additionally, it carries at least 2 plasmids.

References

Further reading

External links

LPSN
Type strain of Deinococcus geothermalis at BacDive -  the Bacterial Diversity Metadatabase

Polyextremophiles
Radiodurants
Space-flown life
Deinococcales
Bacteria described in 1997